Jason Coy (born 10 November 1982) is a former Gaelic footballer for Knockmore GAA. Coy was brought up just outside of Ardagh in Cloghans, County Mayo. He attended Knockmore Primary School and Gortnor Abbey Secondary School in Crossmolina. He won Connacht and All-Ireland GAA Schools titles under Gerry Leonard for Gortnor Abbey.

See also
 Knockmore GAA
 The Green and Red of Mayo

References

Knockmore Gaelic footballers
Sportspeople from County Mayo
1982 births
Living people
People educated at Gortnor Abbey